Lusapho Lesly April (born May 24, 1982) is a South African long-distance runner. He was born in Uitenhage. He competed in the marathon at the 2012 Summer Olympics in London, but managed only 43rd place after falling mid-race.

He set a national record in 25 km road running (1:15:02 ) in 2010. He is a two-time winner at the Two Oceans Half Marathon. He set a course record at the 2013 Hannover Marathon, winning in a personal best time of 2:08:32 hours. He was the third-place finisher at the 2013 New York City Marathon.

He competed in the men's marathon at the 2016 Summer Olympics in Rio de Janeiro. He finished in 24th place with a time of 2:15:24.

References

External links

1982 births
Living people
People from Uitenhage
South African male long-distance runners
South African male marathon runners
Olympic athletes of South Africa
Athletes (track and field) at the 2012 Summer Olympics
Sportspeople from the Eastern Cape